Energy is defined via work, so the SI unit of energy is the same as the unit of work – the joule (J), named in honour of James Prescott Joule and his experiments on the mechanical equivalent of heat. In slightly more fundamental terms,  is equal to 1 newton metre and, in terms of SI base units

An energy unit that is used in atomic physics, particle physics and high energy physics is the electronvolt (eV).

In spectroscopy the unit cm−1 ≈  is used to represent energy since energy is inversely proportional to wavelength from the equation .

In discussions of energy production and consumption, the units barrel of oil equivalent and ton of oil equivalent are often used.

British imperial / US customary units
The British imperial units and U.S. customary units for both energy and work include the foot-pound force (1.3558 J), the British thermal unit (BTU) which has various values in the region of 1055 J, the horsepower-hour (2.6845 MJ), and the gasoline gallon equivalent (about 120 MJ).

Electricity

Electricity usage is often given in units of kilowatt-hours per year or other time period. This is actually a measurement of average power consumption, meaning the average rate at which energy is transferred. One kilowatt-hour per year is about 0.11 watts.

Natural gas
Natural gas is often sold in units of energy content or by volume. Common units for selling by energy content are joules or therms. Common units for selling by volume are cubic metre or cubic feet. Natural gas in the US is sold in therms or 100 cubic feet (100 ft3 = 1 Ccf). In Australia, natural gas is sold in cubic metres. One cubic metre contains about 38 megajoules. In the most of the world, natural gas is sold in gigajoules.

Food industry
In the European Union, food energy labeling in joules is mandatory, often with calories as supplementary information.

Atom physics and chemistry
In physics and chemistry, it is common to measure energy on the atomic scale in the non-SI, but convenient, units electronvolts (eV). 1 eV is equivalent to the kinetic energy acquired by an electron in passing through a potential difference of 1 volt in a vacuum. It is common to use the SI magnitude prefixes (eg milli- , mega- etc) with electronvolts. Because of the relativistic equivalence between mass and energy, the eV is also sometimes used as a unit of mass. The Hartree (the atomic unit of energy) is commonly used in calculations. Historically Rydberg units have been used.

Spectroscopy
In spectroscopy and related fields it is common to measure energy levels in units of reciprocal centimetres.  These units (cm−1) are strictly speaking not energy units but units proportional to energies, with  being the proportionality constant.

Explosions
A gram of TNT releases  upon explosion.

See also 

 Energy consumption
 Conversion of units of temperature
 Conversion of units of energy, work, or amount of heat
 Kilokaiser
 List of unusual units of measurement
 Maximum demand indicator
 Orders of magnitude (energy)
 erg
 Foe (unit)

References

 
Conversion of units of measurement